Sean Evans may refer to:
Sean Evans (interviewer), host of the YouTube series Hot Ones
Sean Evans (basketball), American basketball player
Sean Boog, American rapper born Sean Wayne Evans
Seán Evans, retired Irish sportsperson

See also
Shaun Evans (disambiguation)